The Paceship PY 23 (or PY23) is a Canadian trailerable sailboat, that was designed by John Deknatel of C. Raymond Hunt Associates and first built in 1973.

Production
The boat was built by Paceship Yachts in Mahone Bay, Nova Scotia between 1973 and 1981, Canada and later by American Machine and Foundry (AMF) in the United States, but it is now out of production.

Design

The Paceship PY 23 is a small recreational keelboat, built predominantly of hand-laid up fibreglass with balsa cores and teak and mahogany wood trim. It displaces  and carries  of iron and lead ballast.

The stub iron keel on the centreboard version allows the centreboard to be retracted without using interior cabin accommodation space, as well as beaching without damage to the hull.

This fixed keel version was designed for Midget Ocean Racing Club (MORC) competition.

The design features anodized spars, a self-bailing cockpit designed for six adults and an optional mainsheet traveller. A cockpit dodger was also optional. Below deck accommodations include four cabin windows,  headroom, a "V" berth in the bow, storage shelving and bins, a folding dining table, an optional gallery with an icebox, a stainless steel sink and a  fresh water tank.

The PY 23 was designed so that even if a knock-down occurs that puts the mast in the water, the boat's interior will not take on water and the boat remains self-righting.

The boat is normally fitted with a small  outboard motor for docking and maneuvering.

Operational history

The boat was at one time supported by an active class club, The Paceship, but the club is currently inactive.

In a review Michael McGoldrick wrote, "Unlike the interior of many boats built in the 1970s which have a dinette arrangement, the PY23's layout features two settees which are parallel to the centerline, and a table which folds up against a bulkhead. This layout often provides for more open space in the main cabin. It's also in this size range that boats get big enough to have a semi-private head located behind a bulkhead."

In a 2010 review Steve Henkel wrote, "it is interesting to compare this vessel with the slightly smaller O'Day 22 ... designed by the same firm, Raymond Hunt Associates, at around the same time. The PY23, like her little sister, has a reverse transom, which adds a foot to the hull length, justifying the '23' designation, at least in the minds of her marketers. Both boats were offered with either keel or shoal-draft keel-centerboard configuration. The layouts below are also similar, except for the galley location; the bigger boat puts the galley under the main hatch, where the cook, if he wants, can stand up straight to make dinner. Best features: The coamings are unusually high forward, giving good back support to the PY23's crew. The helmsperson, however has to suffer with a coaming no higher than the O’Day 22's. Down below, a sliding door affords privacy in the head compartment, and the head is well positioned under the forward hatch to give good ventilation and good headroom and knee room. Worst features: While the PY23's cabin space is certainly greater than the Kirby Blazer ... it's a great deal less than the Precision 23's (which is almost a foot longer and half a foot wider)."

See also
List of sailing boat types

Similar sailboats
Beneteau First 235
Bluenose one-design sloop
Hunter 23
O'Day 23
Paceship 23
Precision 23
Rob Roy 23
Schock 23
Sonic 23
Stone Horse
Watkins 23

References

External links

Keelboats
1970s sailboat type designs
Sailing yachts
Trailer sailers
Sailboat type designs by John Deknatel
Sailboat type designs by C. Raymond Hunt Associates
Sailboat types built by Paceship Yachts